Mayhew is an unincorporated community in Lowndes County, Mississippi.

According to the United States Geological Survey, a variant name is Mayhew Station. Mayhew Station was the original name given to this community when it was moved from its original site (near Muldrow, Mississippi) to alongside the tracks of the newly built Mobile and Ohio Railroad (later Gulf, Mobile & Ohio) in the very early 1850s. The original location of the town of Mayhew is now referred to as Old Mayhew, but only a cemetery exists there today. Mayhew held the distinction for most of the 20th century as being home to Stover Apiaries, the world's largest queen bee apiary, which shipped queen bees to beekeepers worldwide.

Mayhew is also referred to as Mayhew Junction, or more commonly as "The Crossroads" by area residents, a reference to when US Highways 82 and 45 crossed as at-grade two-lane highways. Before the construction of the new US 82 and the expansion of US 45 to four lanes, the intersection of the original highways was a four way stop. Several bars and service stations, catering to students from the nearby Mississippi State University, lined the four sides of the original intersection and were torn down when the new expressways were built over a period of several years between 1975 and 1995.

The East Mississippi Community College Golden Triangle Campus is in Mayhew.

In 1818, Mayhew Mission was established at Mayhew by Presbyterians from Massachusetts under Cyrus Kingsbury for the purpose of Christianizing and educating the Choctaw Indians. The population of Mayhew Mission quickly declined after the Treaty of Dancing Rabbit Creek was signed and the Choctaw people were forced to relocate on the Trail of Tears. 

In 1960, seven black men from Little Rock used a restroom at Weaver's Amoco in Osborn, where there was only one restroom, which was for whites only. They were arrested in Mayhew and required to pay a $200 per person bond. According to the law, they faced a maximum penalty of six months in jail and fines of $500 each. The case was widely anticipated as the first test of the state's sit-in law, but was settled when the defendants unexpectedly pleaded guilty and paid a small fine in Starkville the next day.

References

Unincorporated communities in Lowndes County, Mississippi
Unincorporated communities in Mississippi